Gordon Chaplin (31 July 1907 – 27 June 1964) was a Progressive Conservative party member of the House of Commons of Canada. He was born in St. Catharines, Ontario and became a businessman and manufacturer by career.

The son of James Dew Chaplin and Edna Elizabeth Burgess, he was educated in St. Catharines and established himself in business in Galt. Chaplin was president of Canadian General Tower Limited and a director of the Waterloo Savings and Trust Company. In 1920, he married Helen Elizabeth Goring.

Chaplin represented Waterloo South in the Legislative Assembly of Ontario from 1945 to 1948; he was defeated when he ran for reelection in 1948. He was first elected to the House of Commons for the Waterloo South riding in the 1962 general election and re-elected there in 1963. Chaplin died in office on 27 June 1964 during his term in the 26th Canadian Parliament.

His uncle Alexander Dew Chaplin also served in the House of Commons.

Gordon Chaplin Park in Cambridge, Ontario is named in his honour.

Electoral record

References

External links
 James Elliott Gordon Chaplin profile at Waterloo Region

1907 births
1964 deaths
Businesspeople from St. Catharines
Members of the House of Commons of Canada from Ontario
Politicians from St. Catharines
Progressive Conservative Party of Canada MPs
Progressive Conservative Party of Ontario MPPs